Madonna of the Sleeping Cars (French:La madone des sleepings) may refer to

 Madonna of the Sleeping Cars (novel), a 1925 novel by Maurice Dekobra
 Madonna of the Sleeping Cars (1928 film), a French silent film directed by Marco de Gastyne and Maurice Gleize  
 Madonna of the Sleeping Cars (1955 film), a French film directed by Henri Diamant-Berger